Castlevania Legends is the third Castlevania title released for the original Game Boy. It was released in Japan on November 27, 1997 and in Europe and North America on March 11, 1998.

The game was conceived as a prequel to all other games in the Castlevania series; however, it later became recognized as non-canon. The story follows Sonia Belmont, a vampire hunter battling the first incarnation of Count Dracula.

Gameplay

Castlevania Legends is a side-scrolling platformer where the protagonist, Sonia Belmont, armed with a whip, charges through five stages of Count Dracula's castle, filled with various enemies and candles containing items. Each stage ends in a mini-boss fight which rewards a "Soul Weapon", which Sonia can cast, consuming varying amounts of hearts.

The game implements two difficulty levels and password based save states. Should the timer run out, Sonia fall off the screen, or either her life bar or time counter fall to zero, she will lose all of her hearts and one life, and will restart at the beginning of the current screen with the basic whip. If she loses all of her lives, the player is presented with the Game over screen, where they may exit or choose to continue from the beginning of the current stage. Once per stage, Sonia can activate her inborn ability to enter "Burning Mode", where she becomes invincible, moves faster, and has more powerful attacks for ten seconds.

Plot
The story begins in an unspecified year in the Middle Ages in Transylvania, during the incarnation of the original Count Dracula. Sonia Belmont, the first vampire hunter of her clan, develops mystical powers in her 17th year, and ventures out to challenge Dracula, meeting Alucard who seeks revenge against his father. After Dracula's defeat, he swears to Sonia that as long as there is evil in the world, he will be resurrected, and in response she swears her family will always defeat him. The game was designed as the first game in the series timeline, but later declared non-canon after the release of Lament of Innocence.

Reception

IGN called the game one of the Game Boy's cult classics despite the portable system's limitations. GameSpy called the music "disappointing", as the previous two Game Boy Castlevania games were highly praised for their music. Game Informers Tim Turi felt that the game was lacking especially compared to Castlevania: Symphony of the Night.

Longtime Castlevania producer Koji Igarashi removed the game from the series timeline, claiming that in his opinion it conflicted with the plotline of the main games. He has stated that "Legends remains something of an embarrassment for the series. If only that development team had the guidance of the original team of the series."

Time Extension placed Legends fifth last on its list of ranked Castlevania games: "Following the amazing Belmont's Revenge was no easy task, and in all fairness, Legends is an inferior outing in almost every regard, bar the fact that it came with battery back-up so you could save your progress. The visuals, controls and music are all worse than they are in Belmont's Revenge, but that hasn't stopped Legends from becoming one of the most desirable and expensive Game Boy games. It's worth a look, but only via emulation."

In other media
Sonia was one of the confirmed leads in the Dreamcast game Castlevania: Resurrection, up until that game's cancellation.

Notes

References

1997 video games
1990s horror video games
Legends
Game Boy games
Game Boy-only games
Platform games
Video games developed in Japan
Video games featuring female protagonists
Video game prequels
Single-player video games
Video games set in Transylvania
Video games set in the Middle Ages